Render Another Ugly Method is the second studio album by American experimental band Mothers. It was released on September 7, 2018 under Anti-.

Release
On June 22, 2018, the band announced the release of the album, along with the first single "Blame Kit". The second single "Pink" was released on July 24, 2018.

Critical reception
Render Another Ugly Methord was met with "generally favorable" reviews from critics. At Metacritic, which assigns a weighted average rating out of 100 to reviews from mainstream publications, this release received an average score of 73, based on 12 reviews. Aggregator Album of the Year gave the release a 70 out of 100 based on a critical consensus of 14 reviews.

Track listing

References

External links
 
 
 

2018 albums
Anti- (record label) albums